Ángel Paulino Canul Pacab (born 18 September 1962) is a Mexican independent politician. He served as Deputy of the LIX Legislature of the Mexican Congress representing Yucatán, and previously served as municipal president of  Opichén.

References

1962 births
Living people
Politicians from Yucatán (state)
20th-century Mexican politicians
21st-century Mexican politicians
Municipal presidents in Yucatán (state)
Deputies of the LIX Legislature of Mexico
Members of the Chamber of Deputies (Mexico) for Yucatán